Lyton Levison Mphande (born 14 May 1963) is a former Malawian lightweight and light-welterweight boxer. He received a bronze medal at the 1986 Commonwealth Games. He competed at the 1988 Summer Olympics, where he defeated Jhapat Singh Bhujel of Nepal before losing to Anthony Mwamba of Zambia.
He finished in ninth place.

References

1963 births
Living people
Malawian male boxers
Olympic boxers of Malawi
Boxers at the 1988 Summer Olympics
Lightweight boxers
Light-welterweight boxers
Boxers at the 1986 Commonwealth Games
Boxers at the 1990 Commonwealth Games
Commonwealth Games bronze medallists for Malawi
Commonwealth Games medallists in boxing
Medallists at the 1986 Commonwealth Games